Anjutagi  is a village in the southern state of Karnataka, India. It is located in the Indi taluk of Bijapur district in Karnataka.

Demographics
 India census, Anjutagi had a population of 6659 with 3481 males and 3178 females.

See also
 Bijapur
 Districts of Karnataka

References

External links
 http://Bijapur.nic.in/

Villages in Bijapur district, Karnataka